Dhaka-18 is a constituency represented in the Jatiya Sangsad (National Parliament) of Bangladesh by Mohammad Habib Hasan of the Awami League since November 12 of 2020.

Boundaries 
The constituency encompasses Dhaka North City Corporation wards 1 and 17, and Dakshin Khan, Khilkhet, Turag, Uttara, and Uttar Khan thanas.

History 
The constituency was created when, ahead of the 2008 general election, the Election Commission redrew constituency boundaries to reflect population changes revealed by the 2001 Bangladesh census. The 2008 redistricting added 7 new seats to the Dhaka metropolitan area, increasing the number of constituencies in the capital from 8 to 15.

Members of Parliament

Elections

Elections in the 2010s

Elections in the 2000s

References

External links
 

 
Dhaka District
Parliamentary constituencies in Bangladesh